The 1979 Daytona 500, the 21st annual event, was the second race of the 1979 NASCAR Winston Cup Series season. It was held on February 18, 1979. Sports pundits consider the 1979 Daytona 500 to be the most important race in stock car history.

The race was televised live from beginning to end, a rarity in the era, and the first for a 500-mile race in the United States. Camera angles such as the "in-car" view were introduced to viewers from all over the United States.

On the final lap, race leaders Cale Yarborough and Donnie Allison collided with each other on the Daytona International Speedway's backstretch. Both drivers' races ended in Daytona's grass infield. The wreck allowed Richard Petty, then over one-half lap behind both, to claim his sixth Daytona 500 win.

As Petty made his way to Victory Lane to celebrate, a fight erupted between Yarborough, Donnie Allison and his brother, Bobby, at the site of the backstretch wreck. Both events were caught by television cameras and broadcast live.

The race brought national publicity to NASCAR. Motorsports announcer and editor Dick Berggren said, "Nobody knew it then, but that was the race that got everything going. It was the first 'water cooler' race, the first time people had stood around water coolers on Monday and talked about seeing a race on TV the day before. It took a while – years, maybe – to realize how important it was." Chip Warren was Chief Starter, according to CBS's Ken Squier.

Television
The 1979 Daytona 500 was the first 500-mile race to be broadcast in its entirety live on national television in the United States. Races were shown on television, but the Indianapolis 500, for example, was broadcast on tape delay later in the evening on the day it was run in this era and usually in edited form. Most races aired during this period were only broadcast starting with the final quarter to half of the race, as was the procedure for ABC's IndyCar broadcasts on their Wide World of Sports program.

CBS signed a new contract with NASCAR to telecast the race.  Ken Squier and David Hobbs were the booth announcers with Ned Jarrett  and Brock Yates in the pits for that race, while other angles, such as an interview with race grand marshall Ben Gazzara and NASCAR founder Bill France, Sr., were handled by Marianne Bunch-Phelps.  The day was fortunate for CBS as a major snowstorm known as the Presidents Day Snowstorm of 1979 bogged down most of the Northeast and parts of the Midwestern United States, increasing the viewership of the event.  The race introduced two new innovative uses of TV cameras, the "in-car" camera and the low angle "speed shot", which are now considered standard in all telecasts of auto racing.

Motor Racing Network broadcast the race on the radio and their announcers included Jack Arute, Barney Hall, Mike Joy, Gary Gerould (who also hosted prerace ceremonies) and Dick Berggren.

Qualifying
Buddy Baker and Donnie Allison qualified first and second and were the only drivers to do so, as only two cars qualify from time trials. All other drivers had to race their way through qualifying races.

Baker won his first qualifying race, with Cale Yarborough, Benny Parsons, Bobby Allison and David Pearson finishing in the top five, with positions 2-5 starting on the inside of rows 2-5, respectively.

In the second qualifying race, pole-sitter Donnie Allison had an engine failure (no penalty for failed engines in the qualifying race until 2018) midway through the race.  Darrell Waltrip won the second qualifying race to start fourth. The rest of the cars starting on the outside of rows 3-5 were A. J. Foyt, Dick Brooks and rookie Dale Earnhardt, Sr. making his Daytona 500 debut.

Notable drivers who failed to advance from qualifying races or speed included USAC star Jim Hurtubise, French sports car ace Claude Ballot-Lena, Cup race winners James Hylton, Morgan Shepherd and future NASCAR Hall of Fame driver Bill Elliott.

Race
The first 15 laps of the 200-lap race were run under green and yellow flag conditions to help dry the track from rain the previous night. This impacted Waltrip, as running at relatively slow speeds on the high banks of the track caused a lack of oil to lubricate his camshaft, resulting in a cam lobe wearing away prematurely and causing his engine to run on seven cylinders for the rest of the race.

On the start of lap 16 (the first green flag lap), pole-sitter Baker lost the draft and fell back. Donnie Allison raced with Yarborough and Bobby Allison, but lost control of his car on lap 31 and forced Yarborough and Bobby Allison to take evasive action. All three cars spun through the backstretch infield, which was slippery and muddy from the rain. Yarborough was forced to repair his car and fell two laps behind the leader, as did Bobby Allison, while Donnie Allison lost one lap. The track would remain under caution through lap 41.

While the field was still under caution on lap 38, Baker dropped out of the race with ignition problems. His team had made some minor welding repairs before the race and it was thought the primary ignition control box had been damaged as the engine was misfiring. During attempts to diagnose and repair the problem, the team switched to the backup box and replaced much of the ignition system to no avail. When the team returned home after the race, engine builder Waddell Wilson determined that the crewman who had switched to the backup box by unplugging the primary ignition box and plugging into the backup box had plugged back into the defective primary box. When Wilson switched to the backup ignition box, the car fired perfectly.

When the caution ended on lap 42, the race became an 18-car battle. Neil Bonnett, driving an Oldsmobile, took the lead and was challenged by Foyt and Waltrip; he fought them off, but was soon challenged by Bobby Allison trying to unlap himself, Earnhardt and dark-horse driver Tighe Scott, driving a Buick Century prepared by Harry Hyde.  A six-car crash on lap 53 eliminated Pearson and others. Donnie Allison raced to unlap himself and made his lap up when Bonnett blew a tire and spun in traffic. Other contenders were eliminated, as Bobby Allison fell multiple laps behind, Harry Gant crashed, Earnhardt over-revved his engine leaving the pits and broke a rocker arm and valve spring, Parsons' car overheated and Scott slid through his pits unable to stop when he hit a puddle of water from Parsons' overheating engine. Past the halfway point, Donnie Allison assumed the lead, but Yarborough used more caution flags to make up his lost laps. Yarborough was on the lead lap with Allison by lap 178.

Finish
Following green flag stops, Donnie Allison took the lead on lap 178 with Yarborough close behind. They pulled away during the final laps and led the next closest competitors by half a lap. Allison took the white flag and was leading the race on the final lap with Yarborough drafting him tightly. As Yarborough attempted a slingshot pass on the backstretch, Allison attempted to block him. Yarborough refused to give ground and as he pulled alongside Allison, his left side tires left the pavement and went into the wet and muddy infield grass. Yarborough lost control of his car and contacted Allison's car halfway down the backstretch. As both drivers tried to maintain control, their cars made contact three more times before locking together and crashing into the outside wall in turn three. The cars slid down the banking and came to rest in the infield. Richard Petty, who was over half a lap behind both drivers before the incident, went on to win, beating Waltrip by one car length.

After the wrecked cars of Allison and Yarborough settled in the infield grass short of the finish line, the two drivers began to argue. Bobby Allison, who was one lap down at that point, stopped where the wreck was, offering Donnie Allison a ride back to the garage. Yarborough blamed Bobby for his defeat due to tensions they had with each other earlier during the race. He struck Bobby in the face with his helmet while Bobby was sitting in his car. Fuming, Bobby jumped out of his car and struck Yarborough in the mouth.

Yarborough knocked Bobby to the ground and struck him in the back with his helmet twice. Donnie Allison grabbed Yarborough from behind, shouting, "Hey!! You wanna fight?! I'm the cat you should be fighting with!" Donnie pulled Yarborough away from Bobby, who jumped up and threw a punch at Yarborough. Bobby grabbed Yarborough by the collar with one arm, shaking him as Yarborough tried to shove him away with his foot and kicking at him. Donnie also held on to Yarborough's arm and swung his helmet trying to defend his brother. A track safety official grabbed Yarborough, trying to pry him away from the Allisons. Yarborough fell to the ground and Bobby jumped on him, hitting him twice in the nose. More track marshalls arrived and restrained all three drivers, separating them after the 16-second brawl.

With Allison and Yarborough wrecking near the end of the last lap, the television audience was mostly shown footage of Petty crossing the finish line to win the race. Brief moments of the fight were seen on national television when the commentators and camera operators realized what was going on and switched to the scene.

Yarborough said, "I was going to pass him and win the race, but he turned left and crashed me. So, hell, I crashed him back. If I wasn't going to get back around, he wasn't either." Allison said, "The track was mine until he hit me in the back," he says. "He got me loose and sideways, so I came back to get what was mine. He wrecked me, I didn't wreck him."

In the aftermath, both Allison brothers and Yarborough were fined $6,000 for actions detrimental to stock car racing. Although all three of them were penalized, the Allison's were put on probation for six months as the incident was judged to have been instigated by them. As per the penalty, the Allison's and Yarborough had to post a $5,000 bond which would be returned over the next several races provided good behavior. Both Bobby and Donnie appealed the penalty, arguing that they weren't the cause of the accident. On appeal, the Allison's probation periods concluded in three months, and Yarborough was put on probation for three months. The initial judgment that the wreck was Allison's fault was amended to place blame equally on both Allison and Yarborough. $5,000 of their $6,000 fines were returned $1000 at a time over the next five races.

The story made the front page of The New York Times Sports section. NASCAR had arrived as a national sport and began to expand from its southeastern United States base and become a national sport, shedding its moonshine running roots along the way.

Play-by-play of the final lap
(The following is an excerpt from the CBS television coverage of the race)

David Hobbs: "The white flag is out, one lap to go. This is it; last lap."

Ken Squier: "Stand by, stand by for a photo finish. Two of the greatest fiddling here, fidgeting with first place, passing some of the stragglers; this is the last lap. Trying to take it home, it's all come down to this. Out of turn two, Donnie Allison in first. Where will Cale make his move?" (Yarborough attempts to slingshot) "He comes to the inside. Donnie Allison throws the block." (The two cars collide and hit the wall) "Cale hits him! He slides! Donnie Allison slides! They hit again! They drive up the turn! They're hitting the wall! They're head onto the wall! They slide down to the inside. Let's watch those third place cars. They're out of it! Who is going to win? Coming down third place, they're coming around for the finish between A. J. Foyt and Richard Petty. Down the back straightaway come the leaders now. Two cars are out. In the backstretch are the leaders, watching for the leaders to come – they're still up in three and four. The leaders are up in turns three and four. Coming down, Richard Petty is now pulling out in front, Darrell Waltrip is in second, A. J. Foyt is in third. Here they come, Waltrip trying to slingshot..." (but Petty blocks him) "...Petty is out in front. At the line..." (the checkered and caution flags wave at the flag stand) "Waltrip to the inside... Petty wins it !! ! Down on pit road it has gone crazy, the Petty crew is out there jumping up and down as Richard Petty has won it."

Hobbs: "Richard Petty has won his 6th Daytona 500 and the crowd here are going absolutely mad!"

Squier: "Well, there he is after a full year without a win as the two leaders tangle in the back straightaway. They threw the block; it didn't work. A. J. Foyt pulls up to congratulate Petty. No matter how hard A. J. fights, when it's over he is a gentleman. Let's look again at that crash." (Square-wipe to a slow motion replay of the Yarborough/Allison crash) "Here it is, they're into the turn already, spinning, sliding. The hopes for Donnie Allison vanish. Cale Yarborough trying to win his third, he's out of it. A sad moment for these people. But for Richard Petty, hurt all of last year, driving most of the year with a broken and battered body, he comes home a winner today after 45 straight losses. We... if we can, we should be down at pit road. Tell the folks in the truck just a moment. It's going to be some scene, just a moment. The 18-year-old son of Richard Petty, Kyle..." (who had just started his racing career) "...out there waiting for his father. They have both, they have both tasted success..." (Kyle had won the Daytona ARCA 200 the previous week. Square-wipe to the finish.) "Here is the finish again, ladies and gentlemen. Richard Petty."

Hobbs: "Darrell Waltrip absolutely fighting that car. He got the left wheels on the flat in the bank, and was really out of control there."

Squier: "And here comes a $60,000 car becoming a 22 passenger school bus to bring his crew to victory lane. Richard Petty, the great master, has just recorded his 186th career -" (Cut to the scene of the crash, where Yarborough and both Donnie and Bobby Allison are fighting) "And there's a fight between Cale Yarborough and Donnie Allison !! The tempers overflowing; they're angry. They know they have lost. And what a bitter defeat." (Cut to shot from the Goodyear Blimp looking overhead at the crash site)

Hobbs:  "A couple of very hard men, very hardly upset. And Bobby Allison has stopped by his brother to help. There's Bobby Allison's car number 15. They're leading them away there. They're upset, very upset. It's difficult to tell from here but whatever happened shouldn't really have happened."

(This excerpt is from MRN radio's coverage of the event)

Barney Hall: "White flag for Donnie Allison, they're back in turn one!"

Mike Joy: "Last lap! Donnie Allison is twenty car-lengths back of brother Bobby. Donnie leads Cale Yarbrough by two car-lengths! They're one for the racetrack and the Busch Oldsmobile stays aligned right on the back bumper off Donnie Allison. They are out of turn two, they're down the backstretch, here goes Cale on the inside!!"

Gary Gerould: "Cale makes the move, he's down very close to the grass, Donnie tries to shut him off...Cale's in the grass!! Cale loses it! He tries to pull it back! Donnie side-by-side they make contact! They head toward the wall, they hit the wall in turn number three!!! We'll have a new leader! Both are diving down into the infield now as we look for the leaders coming up the back-straight-away!"

Jack Arute: "They are in turn two in front of Mike Joy!"

Joy: "Here comes Richard Petty! He leads Darrell Waltrip by five car-length, five more lengths back to A. J. Foyt. Race traffic, Waltrip closes, but Petty is up there!"

Hall: "Caution is on the racetrack and it will be a battle back to the start/finish line!"

Gerould: "Heavy traffic in three, Waltrip running right behind Petty! A. J. Foyt is right there. They move to the high side, they want to pass Tighe Scott, Richard brings it into four!"

Eli Gold: "Richard Petty takes the outside, he's got Darrell Waltrip close behind! Two car-lengths back is A. J. Foyt, Richard Petty takes it into the tri-oval!"

Arute: "Here they come to the stripe, Richard Petty's STP Olds-... Waltrip dives to the inside, Petty almost puts him off in the grass, and Richard Petty will win the Daytona 500! The Petty crew, jumping up and down on pit road congratulating each other! This Daytona 500 has had it all! Donnie Allison and Cale Yarborough crash in turn three on that final lap! The 1979 Daytona 500 is history, and ladies and gentlemen, the winner is Richard Petty! Well, Barney Hall, Richard Petty, and the STP Oldsmobile is coming down, remember the reports here the wire services, late last evening? They were saying doctors recommended Richard Petty forgo the Daytona 500 and look to Richmond, Virginia to return to the racing action after that operation, but he has brought the car down to Pit-road and it is being mobbed by the STP racing team. A great two weeks for the Petty Clan."

Gerould: "Jackie, over in turn three, we interrupt for a moment. Cale and Donnie are both out of the cars, Bobby Allison has brought his car down there, a furious discussion is taking place just down below the banks of turn number three and now...it appears we may have a fistfight!!! We see drivers and helmets!! Safety officials trying to jump in there and separate them as tempers have really flared after this amazing incident on the final lap coming into turn number three!! They battle it out on the ground at this time and we can't see as others come in and try to separate those drivers!"

Hall: "Meanwhile, it's a very jubilant crew that is heading to victory lane. We will be talking to them shortly, but first, from Daytona International Speedway, this is the MRN broadcasting company!"

Race results

Race statistics 

 Lead changes: 36
 Cautions/Laps: 7 for 57 laps
 Average speed:

Media 
The race was released on DVD in 2007. It aired again on Fox Sports 1 in February 2015 in a compressed 30-minute format hosted by Dale Earnhardt Jr. It was the subject of the documentary A Perfect Storm: The 1979 Daytona 500, featuring interviews of CBS Sports commentators and 1979 Daytona 500 drivers.

References

Daytona 500
Daytona 500
Daytona 500
NASCAR races at Daytona International Speedway